FK Lozar was a football club based in the city of Demir Kapija, Republic of Macedonia.

History
The club was founded in 2001 and was dissolved in 2009.

At one time the club was a member of Macedonian Second League to 2006, when was a merged with FK Vardar Negotino.

External links
Club info at MacedonianFootball 
Football Federation of Macedonia 

Defunct football clubs in North Macedonia
Association football clubs established in 2001
Association football clubs disestablished in 2009
2001 establishments in the Republic of Macedonia
2009 disestablishments in the Republic of Macedonia
FK